The rosy starling (Pastor roseus) is a passerine bird in the starling family, Sturnidae, also known as the rose-coloured starling or rose-coloured pastor. The species was recently placed in its own monotypic genus, Pastor, and split from Sturnus. This split is supported by recent studies, though other related species within its new genus are not yet known for certain.

Taxonomy and systematics
The genus name Pastor, and the old English name come from the Latin pastor, "shepherd", and by extension a pastor. The specific roseus is Latin for "rose-coloured".

Formerly, some authorities also considered the maroon oriole to be a species within the genus Pastor.

Description

The adult rosy starling is highly distinctive, with its pink body, pale orange legs and bill, and glossy black head, wings and tail. Males in the breeding season have elongated head feathers which form a wispy crest that is fluffed and more prominent when the bird gets excited. In winter, the crest is shorter, and the edges of black feathers within the plumage become paler as the edges of these feather erode. Winter plumage in males is comparatively dull.

Females in contrast have a short crest and lack the sharp separation between pink and black.

The juvenile birds can be distinguished from common starling (Sturnus vulgaris) by its obviously paler plumage and short yellow bill. Young birds moult into a subdued version of the adult plumage in autumn, yet these lack the crest. They do not acquire their adult plumage until they are nearly one year old in females, and nearly two years in males. The latter grow plumage very similar to adult females in their second year, but are distinguished by  longer crests and noticeably pale feather edges than female juvenile birds.

Distribution and habitat

The breeding range of this bird is in steppes, semi-deserts and deserts of Central Asia and Southeast Europe. It can be found from northwestern Mongolia via Dzungarei, Xinjiang, Kazakhstan, Kyrgyzstan, Tajikistan, Uzbekistan and Turkmenistan to southern Russia, Ukraine, Azerbaijan and Armenia . Its southern range extends to the north of Afghanistan and Iran . Irregular and rare broods are also observed outside of this area (Romania)  It is a strong migrant, and winters in India and tropical Asia. In India in winter, it often appears to outnumber the local starlings and mynas. The rosy starling is a bird of steppe and open agricultural land. In years when grasshoppers and other insects are abundant, it will erupt well beyond its core range, with significant numbers reaching France,  the United Kingdom and Ireland. The starling is a summer visitor for northwestern Afghanistan, passage migrants in the rest of the Afghanistan and a regular winter visitor in India.

Behaviour and ecology
Rosy starlings (Pastor roseus) are highly gregarious birds, and often form large, noisy flocks, which can on occasion be a pest for growers of cereal crops or orchards; the birds are strongly attracted to flowering trees. However, they are also greatly beneficial to farmers because they prey on pests such as locusts and grasshoppers, thereby limiting their numbers. The birds breed in tight colonies in a very short breeding season timed to take advantage of peak abundance of grasshoppers between months of May to June.

Breeding
The rosy starling is a colonial breeder, and like other starlings, is highly gregarious, forming large winter flocks. It also shares other species' omnivorous diet, although it prefers insects. 
The song is a typical starling mixture of squeaks and rattles, given with much wing trembling. 
In Xinjiang, China, farmers used to use insecticide to eliminate locust, which is costly and polluting. In the 1980s, experts found that rosy starlings which fly to Xinjiang farms and feed on locusts could be used for control instead. The experts begin to build artificial nests to attract rosy starlings, an effort reported to be so successful that the number of locusts was insufficient to feed the birds, causing many juveniles die for hunger. By the 2000s many Xinjiang farms greatly decreased the usage of insecticide.

Food and feeding

The rosy starling feeds chiefly on fruits, berries, flower-nectar, cereal grains and insects. 
Specific observations of preferred food types made on the feeding habits of rosy starling are listed as:
Fruits and berries: Ficus (many species), Lantana spp., Ziziphus oenopolia, Bridelia montana, Streblus asper, grapes, mulberries (Morus), dates, Salvadora persica, Capparis aphylla and chillies.
Flower-nectar: Salmalia persica, Bombax insigne, Erythrina indica and Erythrina suberosa, Butea monosperma, Careya arborea.
Cereal grains: Jowar and bajra.
Insects: largely locusts and grasshoppers, beetles of the families Lucanidae, Elateridae, Tenebrionidae, Buprestidae, Scarabaeidae and Curculionidae.

Gallery

References

External links
 
 
David, J. P., Manakadan, R., & Ganesh, T. (2015). Frugivory and seed dispersal by birds and mammals in the coastal tropical dry evergreen forests of southern India: A review. Tropical Ecology, 56(1), 41–55.

rosy starling
Birds of Central Asia
Birds of South Asia
rosy starling
rosy starling